Lawyer Quince may refer to:

 Lawyer Quince (short story), a short story by W. W. Jacobs
 Lawyer Quince (1914 film), a British film
 Lawyer Quince (1924 film), a British film